is a village located in Yamanashi Prefecture, Japan. ,  the village had an estimated population of 701, and a population density of 13 persons per km2.

Geography
Kosuge is located in the mountainous far northeastern corner of Yamanashi Prefecture. The municipality consists of eight hamlets of Hashidate, Kawaike, Tadamoto, Nakagumi, Tobu, Shirasawa, Konagata, Nagasaku. The seven villages from Hashidate to Konagata are along the Kobuchi River in the Tama River water system, and the Nagakushi village is along the Tsurugawa River in the Sagami River water system. The hamlets have elevations between 540 and 780 meters. Forest occupies 95% of the total area of the village, with 30%  protected watershed forest within the Chichibu Tama Kai National Park, providing water for the Tokyo Metropolis.

Neighboring municipalities
Yamanashi Prefecture:
Uenohara
Otsuki
Kōshū
Tabayama
Tokyo metropolis:
Okutama

Climate
The village has a climate characterized by characterized by hot and humid summers, and relatively mild winters (Köppen climate classification Cfa).  The average annual temperature in Kosuge is 8.9 °C. The average annual rainfall is 1552 mm with September as the wettest month. The temperatures are highest on average in August, at around 22.1 °C, and lowest in January, at around -2.2 °C.

Demographics
Per Japanese census data, the population of Kosuge has decreased over the past 60 years.

History
During the Edo period, all of Kai Province was tenryō territory under direct control of the Tokugawa shogunate. During the cadastral reform of the early Meiji period on July 1, 1889, the village of Kosuge was created within Kitatsuru District, Yamanashi. Discussions to merge with the neighboring city of Kōshū, Yamanashi in 2008 have been shelved.

Economy
The economy of Kosuge is primarily based on forestry and agriculture.

Education
Kosuge has one public elementary school and one public junior high school operated by the village government. The village does not have a high school.

Transportation

Railway
The village has no passenger rail service. The nearest train station is Oku-Tama Station in Okutama, Tokyo.

Buses
All route buses operated in Kosuge stop at  bus stop.

Highway

References

External links

Official Website 

 
Villages in Yamanashi Prefecture